Huexotla or Huexotla is an archaeological site located 5 kilometers south of Texcoco, at the town of San Luis Huexotla, close to Chapingo, in the Mexico State.

Huexotla is considered to hold vestiges of the most important ancient Acolhuacan reign in the east of the Mexico highlands plateau. 

Although a few buildings remain in Huexotla, it was a very large city that extended well beyond the perimeter wall, in fact, the only known structure of its kind in the region from the late postclassical. It is believed that the Huexotla main structure once existed at the place where the Franciscan convent and the Church of St. Louis were built.

Huexotla, Coatlinchán and Texcoco were the main Acolhua culture cities and its development began in the 13th century.

These cities more than likely had a common faith and destiny, from its founding throughout 1520; they formed part of the Aztec Triple Alliance.  At the time of the Spanish conquest of the Aztec Empire, it was one of the largest and most prestigious cities in central Mexico, second only to the Aztec capital, Tenochtitlan.  A survey of Mesoamerican cities estimated that pre-conquest Texcoco had a population of 24,000 and occupied an area of 450 hectares.

Texcoco was founded in the 12th century, on the eastern shore of Lake Texcoco, probably by the Chichimecs.  In or about 1336, the Acolhua, with Tepanec help, expelled Chichimecs from Texcoco and Texcoco became the Acolhua capital city, taking over that role from Coatlinchan.

In 1418, Ixtlilxochitl I, the tlatoani (ruler) of Texcoco, was dethroned by Tezozomoc of Azcapotzalco.  Ten years later, in 1428, Ixtlilxochitl's son, Nezahualcoyotl allied with the Aztecs to defeat Tezozomoc's son and successor, Maxtla.  Texcoco and the Aztecs of Tenochtitlan, with the Tepanecs of Tlacopan, subsequently formalized their association as the Triple Alliance.

Texcoco thereby became the second-most important city in the eventual Aztec empire, by agreement receiving two-fifths of the tribute collected.

Texcoco was known as a center of learning within the empire, and had a famed library including books from older Mesoamerican civilizations.

Around 1960 the site was explored by Eduardo Pareyón Moreno

Background
The Otomi peoples were likely the original inhabitants of the central Mexican highlands before the arrival of Nahuatl speakers around ca. 1000 AD, but were gradually replaced and marginalized by Nahua peoples.

Although no exact date of the establishment of the first humans in the Texcoco area is available, from historical review it is likely that the first settlers had Teotihuacan or Toltec origins. Historical sources based on the Xolotl, Tolotzin and Quinatzin codices, among others, indicate that its founders belonged to a Chichimeca group arriving at the Basin of Mexico and established in the province that the Aztecs called Acolhuacán.

The name Texcoco is written several times and places as, Tezcoco Tezcuco and Texcoco. One of the causes of the different meanings of the word Texcoco, there are various ways codices represent to this place. For example, in Codex Azcatitlán a pictograph representation is a stone, symbol of the Hill or place with a flower above; in the Codex Cruz appears as the sign of a place or Hill with a pot above; the Xolotl codex can depicts a hill and a stone which in turn has a pot above; in the Quinantzin Map represents a pot with an outgrowing plant, with stone material in the background.

A different interpretation is found at the Osasuna Codex: Texcoco was the capital of the Acolhuacán province; the Codex Osasuna depicts symbols of this province.

The official municipality glyph was taken from the Mendocino Codex, which represents Texcoco with a hieroglyph that brings together both, the Acolhuacán and Texcoco symbols; an arm with the water sign, next to a cliff where two plants flourish. That is why Manuel Orozco and Berra consider this hieroglyphic complex as the city of Texcoco in the Acolhuacán province.

Toponymy
Huexotla is a Nahuatl name, that means the “willows place”, and it probably makes reference to the forest that existed here during pre-Hispanic times, at the foot of the Tláloc mountain range.

Texcoco, based in codices and Nahuatl etymology, as well as phonetic rules, Tezcoco has the following roots: "Tlacolt = Jarilla" this refers to the plant to sprout on flat land "Texcalli – crag or cliff" the translation is probably "in the S cliffs".

Acolhuas
The Acolhua are a Mesoamerican people who arrived in the Valley of Mexico in or around the year 1200 CE.   The Acolhua were a sister culture of the Aztecs (or Mexica) as well as the Tepanec, Chalca, Xochimilca and others.

It is likely that the ruling family of the Acolhua were descendants from Otomi speakers and did not speak Nahuatl until decreed by their ruler (tlatoani) Techotlalatzin.

Under Techotlalatzin's grandson, Nezahualcoyotl, the Acolhua allied with the Mexica (Aztecs) in the Aztec Triple Alliance.  The Acolhua capital, Texcoco, became a cultural center of the resultant Aztec Empire.

Nezahualcoyotl
Two hundred years after the arrival of the first Chichimeca groups, the greatest Texcoco ruler was born: Acolmiztli Nezahualcoyotl.

Of all the great warriors and priests who influenced Mexico history, Acolmiztli-Nezahualcoyotl was one of the greatest, was born in the year Ce-tochtli (year 1 Rabbit), under the Cemazatl (deer) day and sign, and almost at the end of the Tocoztzintlan month, which corresponds to April 28, 1402.
His father died in 1417 CE, his death was ordered by Tezozomoc, Azcapotzalco’s lord orders, when Nezahualcoyotl was 15 years old.

Acolmiztli Nezahualcoyotl gained the favor of the Lords of Huexotzinco and Tlaxcala, as well as his maternal line relatives, the Aztecs and as of year 3 rabbit (1430) he undertook the release of his father's domains that were oppressed by the tepanecas. Crowned in 1431 and two years later with the support and partnership of the México-Tenochtitlan Empire, permanently settled in Texcoco. His reign lasted over forty years and during that period culture, arts, as well as the building of palaces and temples had a boom. King Acolmiztli-Nezahualcóyotl died in year 6 Flint (1472) and his heir was Nezahualpilli.

Otomi
The Otomi people  is a native ethnic group inhabiting the central highlands of Mexico. The two most populous groups are the Highland or Sierra Otomí living in the mountains of La Huasteca and the Mezquital Otomí, living in the Mezquital Valley in the eastern part of the state of Hidalgo, and in the state of Querétaro. Sierra Otomí usually self-identify as Ñuhu or Ñuhmu depending on the dialect they speak, whereas Mezquital Otomi selfidentify as Hñähñu   (pronounced ). Smaller Otomi populations exist in the states of Puebla, Mexico, Tlaxcala, Michoacán and Guanajuato. The Otomi language belonging to the Oto-Pamean branch of the Oto-Manguean language family is spoken in many different varieties some of which are not mutually intelligible.

The Otomi traditionally worshipped the moon as their highest deity, and even into modern times many Otomi populations practice Shamanism and hold pre-Hispanic beliefs such as Nagualism. Otomies traditionally subsisted on maize, beans and squash as most Mesoamerican sedentary peoples, but the maguey (century plant) was also an important cultigen used for production of alcohol (pulque) and fiber (henequen).

Otomi Language
The Otomi language is part of the Oto-Manguean languages family, which also includes Chichimeca Jonaz, Mazahua, Pame, Ocuilteco, and Matlatzinca, which belong to the Otomangean language group (consisting of the Amuzgoan, Chinantecan, Mixtecan, Otopamean, Popolocan, Tlapanecan, and Zapotecan language families). The Otomi of the Valle de Mezquital speak nHa:nHu while the Otomi south of Querétaro speak nHa:nHo, together amounting to 300,000 people (some 5 to 6 percent is monolingual), most of whom live in the states of Hidalgo (Valle de Mezquital), México, Puebla, Querétaro, Tlaxcala, Michoacán and Veracruz.

The Site
The site and remains of pre-Hispanic constructions are scattered over an extensive area, between modern and colonial constructions as well as agricultural fields.

Unfortunately, site investigations were halted a couple of years ago, in spite of the fact that several unexplored mounds are identified in the zone.

It has different structures that comprise a central structures complex, from which ancient settlers small constructions groups and residential were distributed, Chichimeca vestiges were found, dating back to 1173 AD.

The groups are “La Muralla”, “La Estancia”, “La Comunidad”, El Grupo “Santa Maria”, “San Marcos and Santiago”.

Among the remaining archaeological vestiges is the Wall constructed between the San Bernardino and Chapingo rivers; the section better preserved is located west of the ex-convent. Towards the east are two basements, on top of the structure called “La Comunidad” are remains of rooms with furnaces.

Structures
The archeological site preserves an enigmatic set of battlement walls built between the San Bernardino and Chapingo rivers; the better-preserved section is west of the former convent.

Towards the east two plinths can be visited, on top of the “La Comunidad” section are remains of rooms with tlecuiles or braziers.

Over the San Bernardino river are several pre-Hispanic architectonic sets, two are especially interesting; the circular basement is a sample of temples dedicated to Ehécatl, “Wind God” (invocation of Quetzalcoatl), next to it is a small foundation, probably from a previous or contemporary to the first circular stage construction.

At the location of structures 1 and 2, is an INAH office, with an attentive keeper, that readily provides site information and literature.

The Santiago chapel is an example of the form in which Spaniards religiously converted American natives; the small chapel was built over a pre-Hispanic building (perhaps the most important).

Other two sets are the Observatory or San Marcos and Santa Maria, in the Santa Maria the different constructive stages are remarkable, and the use of pumice stone in the construction works.

The following numbers assigned to each structure are arbitrary, used for the sake of structure identification, in relation to the site plan. The orientation of all structures deviate from cardinal directions.

Structure 1

This platform represents the largest remaining structure, it is oriented east-west measuring some 48 square meters and there are indications of important constructive details.

On its western side is a large access stairway about 15 meters wide with 4 meter alfardas in both sides, except for a few sections, all other sides are now destroyed.

The northern side has, at both corners, remains of the side wall and stucco remains, that probably covered the entire building, the color with which was probably painted is not visible. The North West corner has a lower “C” shaped structure about 6 meters below the current terrain, probably an indication of several stages of construction. Its purpose is not known. (See Lower Structure photograph)

Structure 2

This structure measures some 40 by 32 meters, it is east of Structure 1 and somewhat lower. Its orientation is also east – west and its alignment is shifted a few degrees. Due to its proximity, it is possible it was associated with the functions of Structure 1, possibly used for residential purposes.

Although no details of access stairways remain, on its western side, facing structure 1, is a sort of a ramp leading to and from structure 1.

On top of this structure there are several rooms, with access from a central hallway. The floor and wall remains have traces of red painted stucco. There are three square holes probably used as braziers, for cooking and heating purposes.

Structure 3

It is located to the south-east of the previous structures; it is highly destroyed measuring some 31 by 10 meters (101 by 34 ft.). It is a rectangular building, with remains of the perimeter wall standing; apparently, it had several rooms, indicated by remains of internal dividing walls. It is located inside a fence.<

Structure 4

Ehécatl round temple probably used for ceremonial purposes, measuring some 15 meters in diameter. The structure has three stacked concentric round stages.

This structure has a square structure attached on its eastern side, and its overall length is about 25 meters, the square structure measures some 10 meters wide. This square structure probably had an access stairway, and depicts various structural details, for unknown purposes. On its south side there is another square structure, detached. It measure about 10 square meters possibly associated with ceremonies conducted in the temple.

Structure 5
This structure is located some 500 meters west of structure 4. It is an irregular rectangular shape platform with some remaining walls and floors, measuring some 17.45 by 16.37 meters (57.24 by 53.7 ft.). It is located inside a fence.

Structure 6

This structure is represented by a stone masonry pre-Hispanic bridge. Its overall length at the top is about 21.5 meters long by 4.9 meters wide (70 by 16 ft.). It has an equilateral pointed arch type construction, measures some 16 meters long, by 5 meters wide. The bridge top is about 15 meters over the ravine and river below and has a clear span of about 7 meters and it keystone is about 8 meters high.

A peculiarity of this structure consists of an attached structure on the bridge south-west corner that protrudes about six meters. Its purpose and characteristics are unknown.

Structure 7
This structure comprises several constructed remains, and it is located across the river, south of structure 1. It consists of two irregular structures and walls remain.

Structure 8
This item represents an unexplored mound.

Structure 9
This structure represents remains of a defensive wall that probably surrounded the city. The structure measures about 6 meters high; with battlement protrusions extending two to three meters above. The walls are tapered with a width of about three meters at the bottom tapering down to about one meter at the top.

The walls are currently used to delimit private property areas, and the west side of the chapel.

Gallery

References

Bibliography
 
 
 

 Smith, Michael E.  (2008)  Aztec City-State Capitals. University Press of Florida, Gainesville (in press).
 
 
Manuscritos Otomies del Virreinato - Paper in Spanish by David Wright Carr
Otomies en las fuentes - Paper in Spanish by David Wright Carr
Lengua cultura e historia de los Otomíes Paper in Spanish by David Wright Carr

Further reading
 Hicks, Frederic  (1982)  Tetzcoco in the Early 16th Century: The State, the City and the Calpolli. American Ethnologist 9:230-249.
 Offner, Jerome A.  (1983)  Law and Politics in Aztec Texcoco. Cambridge University Press, New York.
 Texcoco (altepetl)

Pictures of Otomi weaving styles
Film about Otomis
Pre-Hispanic Mesoamerican Codices

External links
 Texcoco Official site 

Mesoamerican sites
Archaeological sites in the State of Mexico
Archaeological sites in Mexico
Tourist attractions in the State of Mexico